Bowgada may refer to:

 Bowgada, Western Australia, a small town
 Bowgada wattle, common name for Acacia ramulosa, a shrub
 Acacia ramulosa var. linophylla, a spreading shrub or low tree